Proctorsville is a census-designated place (CDP) in the town of Cavendish, Windsor County, Vermont, United States.  As of the 2010 census, the population of the CDP was 454.

Geography
The center of Proctorsville is located just east of the junction of Vermont Route 131 with Vermont Route 103, along the Black River. Route 131 heads east through Cavendish village towards Ascutney, while Route 103 travels west to Ludlow and south through Proctorsville Gulf to Chester.

References

Census-designated places in Vermont
Census-designated places in Windsor County, Vermont